Emily Young (born 15 January 1991), also known as Emily Weekes, is a Canadian female Paralympic cross-country skier and biathlete. She has competed formerly as a wrestler and triathlete for Canada in international and national competitions.

Early career 
Emily Weekes competed in 2009 Canada Summer Games and claimed a bronze medal in the wrestling event. She sustained a nerve damage from an injury in her right arm due to a wrestling training accident at the age of eighteen just after the conclusion of the 2009 Canada Summer Games. As a result of the accident, she had to withdraw from competing in wrestling and triathlon events. In fact, her Olympic dream as a wrestler spoilt due to the nerve damage.

Paralympic career 
She made her Paralympic debut for  Canada at the 2018 Winter Paralympics and claimed her first Paralympic medal after clinching a bronze medal in the women's 7.5km classical standing cross-country skiing event.

She was also the member of the Canadian mixed relay team which secured a silver medal in the 4 x 2.5 km mixed relay event as a part of the 2018 Winter Paralympics.

References

External links 
 
 

1991 births
Living people
Canadian female sport wrestlers
Canadian female triathletes
Canadian female biathletes
Canadian female cross-country skiers
Cross-country skiers at the 2018 Winter Paralympics
Biathletes at the 2018 Winter Paralympics
Paralympic biathletes of Canada
Paralympic cross-country skiers of Canada
Paralympic silver medalists for Canada
Paralympic bronze medalists for Canada
Medalists at the 2018 Winter Paralympics
Medalists at the 2022 Winter Paralympics
Sportspeople from North Vancouver
Paralympic medalists in cross-country skiing
21st-century Canadian women